Matthew Chahda (born 12 September 1993) is an Australian racing car driver. He currently competes in the Dunlop Super2 Series in the No. 18 Ford FG X Falcon

Racing career

Super2 Series
After competing in the 2013 and 2014 Kumho Tyres V8 Touring Car Series, Chahda graduated to the Dunlop Series competing in the first two rounds in 2015 for RSport Engineering and his own family team for the rest of the season and the full series in 2016, again with the family run team. After being refused for the Superlicence dispensation, Chada continued in the Super2 Series with a Holden VF Commodore and finished the championship in 16th place.

Supercars
On 9 February 2017 it was announced that Chahda would be stepping up to the main game, driving a Holden VF Commodore for Lucas Dumbrell Motorsport, despite having only finished 20th in the previous DVS season with not even a top 10 finish. This came off the back of the controversial decision the day before to allow 16 year old Alex Rullo to drive for the same team. Shortly after the announcement the Confederation of Australian Motor Sport released a statement which stated that Chahda had been refused dispensation for a Superlicence for the 2017 season.

Career results

Super2 Series results
(key) (Race results only)

Complete Bathurst 1000 results

References

Australian racing drivers
Living people
Sportspeople from Albury
Supercars Championship drivers
1993 births
Racing drivers from New South Wales